James Walsh may refer to:

Government and military
James A. Walsh (Medal of Honor) (1897–1960), U.S. seaman and participant in the 1914 occupation of Veracruz
James Augustine Walsh (1906–1991), U.S. federal judge
James Donald Walsh (born 1946), United States Ambassador to Argentina from 2000 to 2003
James H. Walsh, American labor organizer
James J. Walsh (New York politician) (1858–1909), American politician, U.S. Representative from New York
J. J. Walsh (1880–1948), aka James Joseph Walsh, Irish Cumann na nGaedheal politician, TD for Cork Borough
James Morrow Walsh (1840–1905), NWMP officer and first commissioner of Yukon Territory
James T. Walsh (born 1947), American politician, U.S. Representative from New York

Religious
James Walsh (Irish priest) (1837–1919), Irish Anglican priest
James Anthony Walsh (1867–1936), American Roman Catholic priest, founder of Maryknoll Fathers and Brothers
James Edward Walsh (1891–1981), American Maryknoll bishop and missionary

Sports
James Walsh (cricketer) (1913–1986), Australian cricketer
James Walsh (equestrian) (born 1948), Irish Olympic equestrian
James Walsh (hurler) (born 1983), hurler from Ballinakill in Laois
James Walsh (swimmer) (born 1986), Philippine swimmer
James Andrew Walsh (1909–1985), Irish hurler
Flat Walsh (James Patrick Walsh, 1897–1959), Canadian ice hockey goaltender

Others
James Walsh (convict) (born 1833), transported convict, known for prison wall paintings in Western Australia
James Walsh (musician) (born 1980), British musician, frontman of the rock band Starsailor
James Joseph Walsh (1865–1942), American physician and author
James P. Walsh (born 1953), American organizational theorist
James Walsh (physician), Irish medical doctor

See also
Jim Walsh (disambiguation)